Davis Field  is a county-owned public-use airport located three nautical miles (6 km) southwest of the central business district of Folkston, a city in Charlton County, Georgia, United States.

Facilities and aircraft 
It has one runway designated 18/36 with a 2,500 by 50 ft (762 x 15 m) asphalt pavement. For the 12-month period ending February 2, 2006, the airport had 3,000 aircraft operations, an average of 250 per month, all of which were general aviation.

References

External links 
 Davis Field at Georgia DOT Aviation web site
 

Airports in Georgia (U.S. state)
Buildings and structures in Charlton County, Georgia
Transportation in Charlton County, Georgia